Not or NOT may refer to:

Language
 Not, the general declarative form of "no", indicating a negation of a related statement that usually precedes
 ... Not!, a grammatical construction used as a contradiction, popularized in the early 1990s

Science and technology
 Negation, a unary operator in logic depicted as ~, ¬, or !
 Bitwise NOT, an operator used in computer programming
 NOT gate, a digital logic gate (commonly called an inverter)
 Nordic Optical Telescope, an astronomical telescope at Roque de los Muchachos Observatory, La Palma, Canary Islands

Other uses
 Nottingham railway station (station code NOT)
 Polish Federation of Engineering Associations (Naczelna Organizacja Techniczna)
 Not, Missouri, an unincorporated community in the United States
 "Not" (song), a 2019 song by Big Thief

See also
 Knot (disambiguation)